Dixon's leaf-toed gecko (Phyllodactylus dixoni) is a species of lizard in the family Phyllodactylidae. The species is endemic to Venezuela.

Etymology
The specific name, dixoni, is in honor of American herpetologist James R. Dixon.

Habitat

Reproduction
P. dixoni is oviparous.

References

Further reading
Rivas GA, Molina CR, Ugueto GN, Barros TR, Barrio-Amorós CL, Kok PJR (2012). "Reptiles of Venezuela: an updated and commented checklist". Zootaxa 3211: 1–64. (Phyllodactylus dixoni, p. 13). (in English, with an sbstract in Spanish).
Rivero-Blanco C, Lancini AR (1968). "Phyllodactylus dixoni: Una nueva especie de lagarto (Sauria: Gekkoninae) de Venezuela". Memoria de la Sociedad de Ciencias Naturales La Salle 27: 168–175. (Phyllodactylus dixoni, new species). (in Spanish, with an abstract in English).
Rösler H (2000). "Kommentierte Liste der rezent, subrezent und fossil bekannten Geckotaxa (Reptilia: Gekkonomorpha)". Gekkota 2: 28–153. (Phyllodactylus dixoni, p. 104). (in German).

Phyllodactylus
Reptiles of Venezuela
Reptiles described in 1968